Filipa Alexandra Carmo da Silva (born 1995) is a South African singer and songwriter.

She gained wide recognition for winning the RyanSeacrest.com's cover song competition for her rendition of One Direction's song, "Story of My Life". After five rounds, Filipa won the competition with her Pearl Harbor-themed music video directed by Kyle White. Ahead of UK The X Factor, twins Jedward who were runners-up, and USA The X Factor finalist Josh Levi, who came third.

This provided her with a global platform to release her debut single Chills in May 2014.

No stranger to live performance and in tribute to her Mediterranean roots, Filipa was asked to sing the Portuguese national anthem at the Portugal–Mozambique friendly during the 2010 FIFA Soccer World Cup; in front of no less than 30,000 people.

Filipa has spent much of her time since 2014 working with songwriters and producers in the US, including Grammy-Award-winning songwriter Pam Sheyne (best known for Christiana Aguilera’s global hit, “Genie in a Bottle”). She collaborated with her for her own hit single, Little White Lie. Released in 2016, Little White Lie quickly climbed the iTunes and South African radio charts.

She has also spent time developing her own unique tone, as well as pushing her musical boundaries to grow as an artist while studying online towards a BA degree in the Liberal Arts.

She was honored with Glamour’s Next Big Thing at the Women of the Year Awards in 2014, as well as a Cosmo Awesome Women Nomination.

Fans can expect much more from the local sensation, who is set to release several singles and an EP in months to come. Working with artists, producers, and songwriters, both locally and abroad, Filipa’s upcoming work is sure to create the stir that is now expected from her talent, perseverance, and dedication.

References

External links
Official Website

21st-century South African women singers
Living people
1995 births
South African pop singers
South African women singer-songwriters
South African people of Portuguese descent